Vladimír Weiss (born 30 November 1989) is a Slovak professional footballer who plays as a winger or an attacking midfielder for Slovan Bratislava and the Slovakia national team.

Club career

Manchester City
On 16 April 2008, Weiss scored in the second leg of the 2008 FA Youth Cup Final against Chelsea, in a 3–1 (4–2 on aggregate) win. He made his first team debut on 24 May 2009, replacing Stephen Ireland from the substitutes bench after seventy minutes in the final game of the 2008–09 season, a 1–0 win against Bolton Wanderers.

On 28 October 2009, he came on as a substitute against Scunthorpe United in the League Cup. He scored his first senior goal, as a substitute, on 2 December 2009, in a 3–0 League Cup win over Arsenal. He signed a new contract on 17 December 2009, to tie him to the club until 2012.

Bolton Wanderers (loan)
On 25 January 2010, Weiss joined Bolton Wanderers on loan until the end of the season, and made his debut as a last minute substitute a day later in the home game against Burnley. For the most part of his time at the Reebok Stadium, Weiss was a substitute.

Rangers (loan)
On 19 August 2010, Weiss joined Scottish side Rangers on loan until the end of the 2010–11 season. Prior to signing for Rangers, Weiss rejected a move to their city rivals Celtic. He made his Rangers debut against Hibernian at Easter Road on 22 August coming on as a substitute for James Beattie, setting up the second goal with Rangers going on to win 3–0. He scored his first goal for Rangers in a 4–1 home win against Motherwell and five days later made his Champions League debut against Valencia, providing the assist from a corner for Maurice Edu's opener.

On 26 December 2010, Weiss gave a 'Man of the Match' performance, and scored the third goal in a 4–1 SPL victory over Motherwell at Fir Park. On 15 January 2011, Weiss scored twice in a 4–0 home victory over Hamilton Academical. On 20 March 2011, Weiss came off the bench in the League Cup Final against Celtic and made the assist for Nikica Jelavić to score the winning goal, he lifted his first senior trophy as a Rangers player. Weiss claimed a 2010–11 SPL winners medal, Rangers having won the title over rivals Celtic by a single point.

Espanyol (loan)
On 20 December 2011, Weiss scored his first goal for Espanyol in a Copa del Rey match which ended in a 4–2 victory against Celta Vigo. In February 2012 he scored with a "wonderful dipping shot from 30 yards" in a 3–3 draw away at Athletic Bilbao.

Pescara
On 2 August 2012 newly promoted Serie A side Pescara announced the signing of Weiss from Manchester City with the player signing a one-year contract with the option for a further year. He made his debut in a 3–0 home loss to Inter Milan. Weiss scored his first goal in Pescara's 1–0 victory over Palermo on 26 September.

Olympiacos
After turning down a number of offers from clubs in Italy, Spain, England and Russia, on 28 June 2013, Weiss came to Greece to sign with current league champions, Olympiacos. Some hours later, he announced (through his Twitter account) that he was joining Olympiacos in a three-year deal. Commenting on his reason he chose to sign with Olympiacos, he stated; "I chose Olympiacos because it's a great club with great history, their playing in the Champions League and I know they have Crazy fans! Fanatics with the team. I like to play in front of crazy fans because I'm a little crazy too. I also know that Olympiacos has lofty goals, and if I stay many years with the club, I want to win titles."

He scored his first goal for the club on 1 September 2013 in a league match against Levadiakos. On 17 September 2013, Weiss scored his first Champions League goal in a 4–1 home defeat against Paris Saint-Germain. The goal was voted by ESPN as UEFA Champions League best goal of Matchday 1: he "broke down the right and skipped past four challenges – including a sumptuous nutmeg on 19-year-old PSG debutant Marquinhos – before beating Salvatore Sirigu with the aid of a deflection." He netted his next goal in a 2-0 league away win against Panionios. He next scored in a 4–1 away league win over Platanias. Weiss ended his half-season stint at Olympiacos with six goals (four in the Superleague, one in the Greek Cup and one in the UEFA Champions League).

Lekhwiya
On 26 January 2014, Weiss joined Qatari football club, Lekhwiya based in the nation's capital city of Doha for a fee of 5.3 
million euros. Commenting on departing Olympiacos and his move to Qatar, he commented; "I felt great in Greece. I am very grateful to the club for the chance I was given as I was playing in the UEFA Champions League with the best Greek club and I met lots of good people there. I expect another football adventure and I believe that I will not only feel good in Qatar, but also I will grow in terms of football." He made his debut on 31 January 2014 against Muaither when he substituted in 46th minute for Ismaeel Mohammad. Later that match, Weiss made his first assist for Lekhwiya in the 84th minute, when after solo run from the half of the pitched his pass found Youssef Msakni who scored.
In his second game for Lekhwiya, against Al Gharafa, on 4 February 2014, Weiss scored his first goal for the club. On 26 February 2014, he scored the only goal in Lekhwiya's 2–1 away defeat in the United Arab Emirates against one of their giants Al Ain in the first group game of the AFC Champions League.

Al Gharafa
Weiss signed a four-and-a-half-year contract with another Qatar Stars League club, Al Gharafa, in January 2016. Weiss left the club in December 2019, by mutual agreement. Weiss, who had a successful career with Al Duhail, joined Al Gharafa in 2016. However, the Slovakian failed to live up to the expectations at Al Gharafa.

Slovan Bratislava
After a goal-less tie in a derby match against Spartak Trnava of 16 February 2020, the CEO of Slovan Bratislava Ivan Kmotrík jr. had announced, that Weiss had joined the leading team of the Fortuna Liga. Conditions of the signing or Weiss' expected first appearance remained unannounced.

In the previous weeks, Weiss had prepared with Železiarne Podbrezová of 2. Liga, to catch up on his deficits caused by a prolonged injury. Due to the COVID-19 pandemic, Fortuna Liga was suspended. Thanks to this arrangement, Weiss was able to undergo a needed surgery and take part in complete training sessions prior to league's recommencement.

On 19 May 2021, Weiss scored the winning goal, and was subsequently sent off, in the 2021 Slovak Cup Final to ensure a second straight domestic double for Slovan Bratislava.

International career
Weiss made his debut for Slovakia on 12 August 2009 in a 1–1 friendly draw with Iceland. He was included in Slovakia's 23-man squad for the 2010 World Cup in South Africa.

Weiss played in three out of four of his country's games in South Africa, playing a total of 270 minutes. He impressed in the first match against New Zealand where he thrilled the crowd in a 1–1 draw. Weiss featured in the second group game against Paraguay which they lost 2–0 and played a full 90 minutes in the 2–1 defeat to Netherlands in the last 16. Weiss scored the opening goal in a Euro 2016 win against Russia, and thus became the first player to score at the Euros whilst playing for a non-European club.

On 18 May 2021, Weiss was included in the final 26-man squad to represent Slovakia at the rescheduled UEFA Euro 2020 tournament. Weiss appeared as a substitute in the group stage games against Sweden and Spain.

Personal life
Weiss is a third generation international footballer. His father, also called Vladimír Weiss, won 12 caps for the national team, whom he later coached. His grandfather, named Vladimír Weiss too, also represented Czechoslovakia.

Controversy
Night club visit
In September 2012, after a return from a qualifying game in Vilnius against Lithuania (1-1), Weiss, Marek Hamšík, Miroslav Stoch and Karim Guédé, were fined and cautioned after visiting a night club. Coaches Stanislav Griga and Michal Hipp however kept the incident on a low profile.

Fast food incident
On 2 January 2015, Vladimír Weiss, together with former Slovak national team player Filip Šebo and several other people, had a conflict in a fast food restaurant. They were noisy and aggressive, according to the restaurant owner, after he warned someone from their group that threw a chair at the head of another restaurant visitor.

Damaged hotel
Weiss was also present, when SFZ had to pay a Hilton Hotel in Luxembourg City compensation for damaged property in October 2015, after most of the Slovak team, celebrating a qualification for Euro 2016, damaged the property and required police cautioning at 4AM.

Alcohol night drive
On 2 October 2016, 6:45AM (6 days before an important qualification match against Slovenia) police on patrol in Bratislava stopped a Mercedes G owned by Vladimir Weiss with 11 people on board. Vladimir Weiss refused an alcohol test and spent 32 hours at a police station. Slovak national team coach Ján Kozák subsequently banned him for 2 matches. Although he had criminal charges presented by the police against him, the public prosecutor had found that Weiss did not commit the acts of which he was accused and hence he was not prosecuted or tried.

Ján Kozák's resignation incident
Weiss was nominated for a double fixture against Czech Republic and Sweden on 13 and 16 October 2018, respectively. Weiss played in both games, but was also involved in a controversy, that had led to resignation of Ján Kozák, then Slovakia's longest-serving and most successful national team manager.

Weiss violated the code of conduct of national team player, along with Martin Dúbravka, Michal Šulla, Milan Škriniar, Norbert Gyömbér, Ľubomír Šatka and Stanislav Lobotka. On the night of 13 October 2018, after a loss in Slovakia's second UEFA Nations League fixture and a derby match against Czech Republic (1–2), they left the hotel and went out, missed the bedtime and violated the wellness policy, regarding regeneration and rehabilitation. They were allegedly noticed by Ján Kozák at about midnight, admitting to the incident and apologising the next day. Kozák resigned from the national team in the afternoon of 14 October, revealing the details of his decision in a press conference on 18 October, to avoid distractions during the preparation for the fixture against Sweden, that was led by his former assistant Štefan Tarkovič on a caretaker basis. Kozák cited his inability to work with the squad under such conditions as the primary reason, as about a third of the squad was involved, including players Kozák described as crucial for the future of Slovak football, with Weiss among them. The President of SFZ, Ján Kováčik, had punished the players by withholding any financial rewards for any future nominations and performances with the national team, during the upcoming qualification cycle. Kozák also revealed, that upon inquiring the reasons for such conduct, Weiss simply said, that he "doesn't know" why.

On 19 October, SFZ published series of statements made by the concerned players, in which they apologised and accepted their guilt. Weiss however did not provide a statement until the following day, expressing his sincere apologies, for damaging the reputation of Slovak football, acknowledging the negative perception of the incident, accepting the consequences and committing himself to improving the damaged trust. He also stressed his apologies to Kozák and thanked him for his contributions.

End of National team career

On 21 November 2018 he announced his retirement from the national team (at the age of 28) after an altercation with newly appointed national team coach Pavel Hapal. Weiss was angry after being left on the bench on Nations League matches against Ukraine and Czech Republic. During the latter match he stormed off into the locker room mid-match, following Hapal's last substitution, apparently quitting national as he did so.

In February 2020 it was reported that Weiss and Hapal had met over a year after the incident and discussed Weiss' future career prospects, as he was released from his contract in Al Gharafa in December 2019. Following the meeting Hapal had confirmed that he will consider Weiss, who in 2019 had re-expressed a desire to play internationally, in the national team nominations, assuming he finds a club and performs sufficiently. Later in February, Weiss had signed with Slovan Bratislava.

Career statistics

Club

International
Scores and results list Slovakia's goal tally first, score column indicates score after each Weiss goal.

Honours
Rangers
Scottish Premier League: 2010–11
Scottish League Cup: 2010–11

Lekhwiya
Qatar Stars League: 2013–14, 2014–15

Slovan Bratislava
Slovak Super Liga: 2019–20, 2020–21, 2021–22 
Slovnaft Cup: 2019–20, 2020–21
Individual
Slovak Super Liga Player of the Year: 2021–22 
Slovak Super Liga Team of the Year: 2021–22
Slovak Super Liga Player of the Month: March 2022

References

External links
 
 
 2010 FIFA World Cup profile
 
 

1989 births
Living people
Footballers from Bratislava
Slovak footballers
Association football wingers
Slovakia international footballers
2010 FIFA World Cup players
UEFA Euro 2016 players
UEFA Euro 2020 players
Slovak Super Liga players
Premier League players
Scottish Premier League players
La Liga players
Serie A players
Super League Greece players
Qatar Stars League players
FK Inter Bratislava players
Manchester City F.C. players
Bolton Wanderers F.C. players
Rangers F.C. players
RCD Espanyol footballers
Delfino Pescara 1936 players
Olympiacos F.C. players
Lekhwiya SC players
Al-Gharafa SC players
ŠK Slovan Bratislava players
Slovak expatriate footballers
Slovak expatriate sportspeople in England
Expatriate footballers in England
Slovak expatriate sportspeople in Scotland
Expatriate footballers in Scotland
Slovak expatriate sportspeople in Spain
Expatriate footballers in Spain
Slovak expatriate sportspeople in Italy
Expatriate footballers in Italy
Slovak expatriate sportspeople in Greece
Expatriate footballers in Greece
Slovak expatriate sportspeople in Qatar
Expatriate footballers in Qatar
Vladimir